Alianza Universidad is a Peruvian association football club, playing in the city of Huánuco.

History
The club was founded as Alianza Huánuco on January 1, 1939.

The club have played at the highest level of Peruvian football on one occasion, in the 1991 Torneo Descentralizado, but was relegated to the 1992 Torneo Zonal.

In the 2011 Copa Perú, the club classified to the National Stage, but was eliminated by Real Garcilaso in the semifinals. It was invited to play in the 2012 Peruvian Segunda Division. Alianza Universidad played in the Segunda División tournament five seasons from 2012 until 2016. After not much success with gaining promotion the team decided to retire from the tournament and return to the Copa Perú system in 2017 where it will play from the Departamental Stage.

Rivalries
Alianza Universidad has had a long-standing rivalry with León de Huánuco.

Current squad

Honours

National

League
Cuadrangular de Ascenso:
Runner-up (1): 2018

Copa Perú: 
Runner-up (1): 2018

Regional
Región V: 
Winners (3): 2008, 2009, 2011

Región VI:
Runner-up (1): 2007

Liga Departamental de Huánuco:
 Winners (8): 1989, 2004, 2008, 2009, 2010, 2011, 2017, 2018
Runner-up (1): 2007

Liga Superior de Huánuco:
 Winners (2): 2008, 2009
Runner-up (1): 2010

Liga Provincial de Huánuco:
 Winners (1): 2018

Liga Distrital de Huánuco:
 Winners (1): 2018

See also
 List of football clubs in Peru
 Peruvian football league system
 Copa Perú

References

 
Football clubs in Peru
Association football clubs established in 1939
Sport in Huánuco Region